Rodrigo Moreira (born June 19, 1983, in Milagro, Ecuador), is an Ecuadorian model, actor and beauty pageant titleholder who won Mr. America Latina 2009 in Lima, Peru. He is currently a world-class beauty pageant director and producer.

Early life 
Rodrigo started his career as Model at the age of 16 at CN Modelos Guayaquil of Cecilia Niemes.

Pageantry 
Moreira who is 6 ft 1 in (1.85 m) tall, competed in the international beauty pageant Mr. America Latina, on July, 2009 and obtained the title beating sixteen contestants took part in the competition. In addition he did win the Mr. Photogenic award.

Beauty contests 
In May 2012, Rodrigo organized Miss Teen Intercontinental, its first international contest, that same year he became founder of the Miss Teen Earth pageant to promote tourism of Ecuador  and acquired beauty pageants which belonged to the Queen of Ecuador company.

As Director has been responsible for preparing and sending delegates from Ecuador to international contests, his most successful delegatee so far is Daniela Cepeda who won the Miss Teen Earth title and two years later was crowned Miss Ecuador, representing Ecuador in Miss Universe 2017 held at Planet Hollywood in Las Vegas, Nevada, USA.

See also
Luciana Begazo

References

External links 
 Rodrigo Moreira at IMDb
 Rodrigo Moreira at Twitter

Living people
1983 births
People from Milagro, Ecuador
Ecuadorian beauty pageant winners
Male beauty pageant winners
Beauty pageant hosts
Beauty pageant owners
Ecuadorian male models
Ecuadorian male television actors
Ecuadorian businesspeople
Ecuadorian chief executives